The flame-crested tanager (Loriotus cristatus) is a species of bird in the family Thraupidae.  It is found in Bolivia, Brazil, Colombia, Ecuador, French Guiana, Guyana, Peru, Suriname, and Venezuela.  Its natural habitats are subtropical or tropical moist lowland forests and subtropical or tropical dry shrubland. Ten subspecies are currently recognized.

Taxonomy
In 1760 the French zoologist Mathurin Jacques Brisson included a description of the flame-crested tanager in the supplement to his Ornithologie based on a specimen collected in Cayenne, French Guiana. He used the French name Le tangara noir hupé de Cayenne and the Latin name Tangara cayanensis nigra cristata. Although Brisson coined Latin names, these do not conform to the binomial system and are not recognised by the International Commission on Zoological Nomenclature. When in 1766 the Swedish naturalist Carl Linnaeus updated his Systema Naturae for the twelfth edition he added 240 species that had been previously described by Brisson in his Ornithologie. One of these was the flame-crested tanager. Linnaeus included a terse description, coined the binomial name Tanagra cristata and cited Brisson's work. The specific name cristata is Latin for "plumed" or "crested". There are ten subspecies.

Description

The male has a black head, small orangeish-red bib and a moderate-sized orangish crest. The upper parts are slatey-black with a golden-buff rump, and the upper wing-coverts bear a large patch of white. The underparts are dark brownish-black. The female is similar in appearance to the white-winged shrike-tanager (Lanio versicolor) but is more brown above with buff-ochre rather than yellowish-ochre underparts.

Distribution and habitat
This species is native to lowland forest in the northern half of South America. There are two disjunct populations, the larger covering most of the Amazon Basin in Brazil, southern parts of Venezuela, Guyana, Suriname and French Guiana, and eastern parts of Colombia, Ecuador, Peru and Bolivia. The separate part of the range is occupied by the subspecies L. c. brunneus and covers a coastal strip of Brazil from Recife to Curitiba.

Status
L. cristatus is a fairly common species with a very wide range. The population has not been quantified but the trend seems steady, and the total population is presumed to be large. For these reasons, the International Union for Conservation of Nature has rated the conservation status of the bird as being of "least concern".

References

flame-crested tanager
Birds of the Amazon Basin
Birds of the Guianas
Birds of the Atlantic Forest
flame-crested tanager
flame-crested tanager
Birds of Brazil
Taxonomy articles created by Polbot
Taxobox binomials not recognized by IUCN